Walem is a hamlet with about 200 inhabitants in the Dutch province of Limburg. It is largely in the municipality of Valkenburg aan de Geul, but a small part lies in Voerendaal.

It was first mentioned in 1360 as Walheym, and means "settlement of the Walloons".

Walem has place name signs. It was home to 167 people in 1840.

Gallery

References 

Populated places in Limburg (Netherlands)
Valkenburg aan de Geul